CIK Telecom is a Canadian telecommunications company based in Toronto, Ontario. CIK Telecom's services are notably geared towards Chinese Canadians and Asian Canadians, but are not limited to them; it offers its services in English, French, and Mandarin.

History 
CIK Telecom was founded in 2003 in Toronto by Jordan Deng and Jack Jin.
 
CIK Telecom is registered as a licensed carrier with the CRTC (Canadian Radio-Television and Telecommunications Commission) since 2003.

In 2014, the company named 25th fastest growing company in the Canada by Canadian Business.

In 2016 and 2017, PC Magazine ranks CIK the 9th fastest ISP in Canada.

In 2017, CIK has over 170,000 subscribers.

CIK Telecom is a member of the Canadian Network Operators Consortium (CNOC).

Services 
CIK Telecom is a wholesale-network-access-based service provider, connecting its services from Bell Canada, Rogers Communications, Cogeco, Shaw Communications. It provides DSL, Cable and Fiber Internet, VoIP phone services and Cable TV services to residential and business customers.

In 2016, CIK started developing its own fibre optic network in Canada and launched CIK Fiber in condominiums in cities across Canada.

See also 
Internet in Canada

References

External links

 CIK Telecom

Internet technology companies of Canada
Telecommunications companies established in 2003
Companies based in Markham, Ontario
Internet service providers of Canada
Telecommunications companies of Canada
Canadian brands
Internet in Canada
Technology companies established in 2003
Canadian companies established in 2003
2003 establishments in Ontario